Hatni is a census village in Hooghly District in West Bengal, India. The village is located approximately 71 kilometres from Kolkata via the Howrah-Bardhaman Main Line. The nearest railway station is Bainchi.

References

Villages in Hooghly district